The Sebastapol Bell in Windsor is one of two large bells captured at the Siege of Sebastopol in 1855. It is hung in the Round Tower of Windsor Castle and is only rung on the death of the most senior members of the royal family. On 19 February 1856 Queen Victoria viewed captured war trophies from the Siege of Sevastopol at the Royal Arsenal at Woolwich. Victoria decided that one of the captured bells be sent to Windsor Castle. It was presented to Victoria in late December 1868 at Windsor Castle and initially placed on the castle's North terrace alongside a large gun captured during the siege. It was hung in the Round Tower above the steps in the centre of the tower. The bell weighs 17 cwt (771 kg). The bell is inscribed "Sevastopol-Nicolas Sanctus" and with the record of its weight in poods. The Times described its tone as "rich and sonorous" in 1868.

The bell was rung following the death of Edward VII in 1910, 101 times for the state funeral of George V on 27 January 1936, 56 times at the announcement of the death of George VI on 7 February 1952, at the funeral of Queen Elizabeth The Queen Mother in 2002, and 96 times to mark the 96 years of Elizabeth II's life on 9 September 2022 following her death the previous day.

References

1868 in England
Individual bells
Windsor Castle
Works by Russian people